Chargaon Dam, is an earthfill dam on Chargaon river near Varora, Chandrapur district in state of Maharashtra in India. A borderline flood situation was seen in the catchment and the low-lying areas of this dam and the nearby Erai dam in September 2012. The situation came under control after the rainfall stopped.

Specifications

Purpose
 Irrigation

See also
 Dams in Maharashtra
 List of reservoirs and dams in India

References

Dams in Chandrapur district
Dams completed in 1983
1983 establishments in Maharashtra